The Vietnam Veterans Memorial by Kris Snider is installed on the Washington State Capitol campus in Olympia, Washington, United States. The granite memorial was dedicated on May 25, 1987.

See also
 List of Vietnam War monuments and memorials

References

1987 establishments in Washington (state)
1987 sculptures
Granite sculptures in Washington (state)
Monuments and memorials in Olympia, Washington
Vietnam War monuments and memorials in the United States
Washington State Capitol campus